Panjagutta is a commercial and residential area in western Hyderabad, India. The area contains IT hubs, shopping malls and jewellery shops. It has become a major transit point for traffic to and from the Hyderabad districts of Ameerpet, Banjara hills, Somajiguda and Khairtabad. Twin flyovers across the road junction are helping ease the previously heavy traffic flow.

Etymology
The name Panjagutta means hand-mountain in Telugu, after a nearby peak that is reputedly topped by a largely self supporting boulder marked by the hand-print of Imam Ali.

Institutes
Nizam's Institute of Medical Sciences (NIMS) is also situated in here.
Hamstech Institute of Fashion & Interior Design is located here
Asian Institute of Gastroenterology (AIG) is located here.
Focus Diagnostics, a multispeciality diagnostic centre is located.

Transport
Hyderabad Metro has a metro station here to connect it to other parts of city. The buses run by TSRTC connect Panjagutta to all parts of the city. There is also a mini-bus service called Setwin service. The closest MMTS Train station is at Begumpet. BSNL office is situated in Durganagar colony.

References 

Neighbourhoods in Hyderabad, India